The AE85 series of the Toyota Corolla Levin and Toyota Sprinter Trueno are small, front-engine/rear-wheel-drive compact cars within the front-engine/front-wheel-drive fifth-generation Corolla (E80) range—manufactured by Toyota from 1983 to 1987 in coupé and liftback configurations.

The AE85 shares its chassis and basic design with the famous AE86, however the AE85 was designed for economy and mainly differs in its engine, whereas the AE86 was designed for performance. It was only sold in Japan and was not sold in North America or other regions. The leading characters in the VIN do not always use the same characters as the chassis code, so some less powerful variants of the AE86 (with the 1.6 L 4A engine) were sold there with an AE86 chassis code on the build plate in the engine bay but with AE85 in the VIN.

Name
The word "trueno" is Spanish for thunder, and "levin" is Old English for "lightning". The Corolla Levin was sold at Toyota Corolla Store locations, whereas the Sprinter Trueno was sold at Toyota Auto Store locations.

The chassis code "AE85" is used to describe the 1500 cc RWD model from the range. In classic Toyota code, the "A" represents the engine that came in the car (3A series), "E" represents the Corolla, "8" represents the fifth generation (E80 series) and "5" represents the variation within this generation.

Pre-facelift models from 1983-1985 were known as "zenki" (前期, lit. early period), while the facelift 1985-1987 models were known as "kouki" (後期, lit. latter period).

Engine/technical
The AE85 was available with a carburetor-equipped 3A-U  inline-four engine, an SOHC (Single overhead cam) two-valve-per-cylinder motor, which at the time was nothing new; the previous fourth generation Toyota Corollas and Sprinters such as the AE70 featured the same engine. Toyota opted to use the older, less powerful engine in the AE85 to keep costs down, while still providing enough power for an economy-class car. This decision led the AE85 to be outclassed in horsepower by not only the stronger AE86, but most other options at the time. However, it was rated by the Japanese Ministry of Transport to have a fuel economy of 26.4 km/L (62.1 mi/gal) when running at a constant speed of 60 km/h (37.28 mph) which was drastically better than most other cars of its class.

The AE85 featured solid disc brakes on the front and drum brakes on the back, rack and pinion steering, and a K50 cable-clutch manual transmission (an optional automatic transmission was available). It did not incorporate a limited-slip differential (LSD) or ventilated disc brakes in the front and rear of the higher-performing AE86.

Body styles
The AE85 and AE86 was available in multiple body variations, with the Levin and Trueno featuring fixed-headlights and retractable pop-up headlights respectively. Because of their identical outward appearance, the variants can sometimes be mistaken. All AE85 variants have 1.5 L engines, and are nearly identical in form to their 1.6 L counterparts found in the AE86. The AE85 (as well as the AE86) was rear-wheel drive, built on the E70 Corolla platform (same wheelbase length, interchangeable parts, etc.), unlike the front wheel drive E80 models in the same range.

Model variations

SR and SE
The AE85 SR and SE came in both Levin or Trueno versions, the former being a 3-door liftback, and the latter being the 2-door coupé.

XL and GL
Both of these models were low grade versions that were less expensive. The XL model is a 2-door Trueno, and the GL is a 2-door Levin.

XL-Lissé and GL-Lime
The Lissé and Lime were luxury variants of the XL and GL models respectively, marketed heavily towards women in Japan. They featured automatic transmission (some came from the factory in manual) and power steering as standard, and had unique upholstery in the interior. The Lissé is a 2-door Trueno, and the Lime is a 2-door Levin.

Differences between the AE85 and AE86 

There are several differences with the AE85 that sets it apart from the more sportier and upmarket AE86.

Mechanical
 The engine is a 1.5 L SOHC 3A-U, which is less powerful than the 1.6 L DOHC 4A-GEU or SOHC 4A-C engine that the AE86 had.
The manual transmission of the AE85 is a K50 transmission with cable clutch, also featured on the previous generation E70 Corolla/Sprinter. On the other hand, the manual transmission of the AE86 is a T50 transmission with hydraulic clutch.
The AE85 uses solid front disc brakes, while the AE86 is equipped with ventilated disc brakes. It did not have rear disc brakes the AE86 had, and in their place are drum brakes (which were also used on the AE86 GT).
The drive shaft on the AE85 is a one-piece type, while the AE86 has a two-piece type.
The AE85 did not have a limited-slip differential (LSD), which was an option on the AE86.
The AE85 did not have a rear suspension stabilizer bar, except for the SR liftbacks.

Exterior

The AE85 has badges denoting the variant of the model, similar to the AE86. Among those are GL, GL-Lime, XL, XL-Lissé, SE or SR (The AE86 has GT, GT-V or GT-Apex for the Japanese market, DX, SR-5 or GT-S for the North American market and GT or GT-i for some European markets).

In the Sprinter Trueno SE/XL-Lissé coupé, the colour of the B pillar is painted as the same colour of the car, and the window trims are chrome. The North American SR-5 AE86 coupé inherits these differences. The rest of the AE85/AE86 coupé range has a black B pillar colour and black window trims.
The facelifted 1985-1987 Sprinter Trueno AE85 did not come with cornering lamps as standard, unlike with the facelifted 1985-1987 Sprinter Trueno AE86. In its place were non-illuminating orange inserts, filling in the slots where the cornering lamps normally were.

Interior
The redline on the tachometer is at 6000 rpm (The AE86 with the DOHC engines instead had a 7600 rpm redline). The North American SR-5 AE86 (with the SOHC engine) has the same redline. The GL, XL, GL-Lime and XL-Lissé models did not come with a tachometer.
The AE85 did not have the sport seats the AE86 had, and in its place were basic bucket seats. The SR, XL and GL models had seats with small headrests (the North American SR-5 AE86 used these seats), while the SE, XL-Lissé and GL-Lime models had seats with large headrests (also used in the AE86 GT). The facelifted 1985-1987 Corolla Levin SR liftback model inherited the redesigned sport seats from the AE86.

Three steering wheel designs were available throughout the AE85's lifetime, with two designs of a two-spoke steering wheel similar to the lower-medium trim levels of the E80 Corollas/Sprinters as well as on the AE86 GT, and a three-spoke steering wheel for the facelifted 1985-1987 Corolla Levin SR liftback, similar to the AE86 GT-V/GT-Apex and AE82 Corolla GT/FX-GT.

The AE85 in motorsports
Privateer racing teams in Japan would take an AE85 and convert it to an AE86 since it is much cheaper by performing an engine swap. Using modifications such as a bolt-on turbocharger or supercharger, racers can strengthen their vehicle while keeping the light weight of the AE85 body.

In popular culture
In the Initial D anime and manga, side character and Takumi Fujiwara's friend, Itsuki Takeuchi, mistakenly purchases an AE85 Levin SR liftback thinking it was an AE86 Levin GT-APEX liftback, which led to him being initially ridiculed by his co-workers (except for Takumi) and several other street racers in the process. Itsuki would then later put a turbocharger in his AE85 for more power, testing it out on the touge (mountain pass).

Production
The Toyota AE85 (as well as the AE86) was built in either the Kanto Higashi-Fuji plant, or the Takaoka plant.

AE85s built at the (now-closed) Kanto Higashi-Fuji plant came with a "5" designation at the beginning of the serial number. Their plant codes were "M21" and "M22". Only 28% of AE85s were produced at this plant.

AE85s built at the Takaoka plant came with a "0" designation at the beginning of the serial number. Their plant codes were "A54" and "A52". The majority of AE85s were produced at this plant, as it was the original plant where the Toyota Corolla and Sprinter are manufactured.

In both cases, the AE85 never had any export models made from these plants; that would handled by its more sportier and upmarket version, the AE86.

References

AE85
Rear-wheel-drive vehicles
Sport compact cars
1980s cars
Cars introduced in 1983
Cars discontinued in 1987